The Battle of Nisko took place on March 28, 1656, and was one of battles of the Swedish invasion of Poland. It resulted in a victory of Swedish forces, commanded by King Charles X Gustav.

The battle took place during a Swedish raid of southern part of the Kingdom of Poland, in which King Charles X Gustav tried to finally destroy Polish forces loyal to King John II Casimir Vasa. The badly organized Swedish campaign was terminated after the Battle of Jaroslaw, when Charles X Gustav ordered a retreat toward central Poland. At the same time, Polish forces concentrated near Lwow began guerrilla attacks on the Swedish Army. The retreat took place in adverse weather conditions, and Swedish losses were high.

On March 28, 1656, the Swedish Army camped near Nisko. Hungry soldiers began combing the area in search of food, while those sick and wounded remained at lightly guarded camp. Stefan Czarniecki decided to take advantage of this, and his cavalry entered the camp. Alarm was raised by Swedish drummers, and units which had scattered in the countryside returned to camp. 

According to the plan, a Polish unit under Colonel Aleksander Hilary Polubinski was to attack the camp from the rear. However, due to a misunderstanding, Polubinski failed to appear at Nisko. Therefore, after some time, a Polish division faced entire Swedish Army. Czarniecki’s forces were forced to flee, and the Hetman was almost captured by the enemy. The Polish plan failed, while Swedish soldiers once again proved their professionalism. Nevertheless, after the skirmish, remaining Polish banners, loyal to Charles Gustav, switched sides and returned their allegiance to John II Casimir Vasa. A few days later, Swedish Army was blocked by Poles and Lithuanians in the confluence of the Vistula and San river.

References

Sources 
	Miroslaw Nagielski, Warszawa 1656, Wydawnictwo Bellona, Warszawa 1990, 
	Leszek Podhorodecki, Rapier i koncerz, Warszawa 1985, 
 J. Levin Carlblom. Karl X Gustafs Polska Krig och Öfvergången till det 2ndra Sundskriget. Göteborg, Centraltryckeriet, Oscar Ericson.

Nisko
1656 in Poland
Nisko
Nisko